Rhytidophyllum exsertum is a species of plant in the family Gesneriaceae, native to Cuba.

References

 Atrium entry
 Fairchild Tropical Botanic Garden Plant Names Catalog: October 2009

exsertum
Endemic flora of Cuba